Jeffrey Prescott is an American attorney and foreign policy advisor serving as the deputy to the United States Ambassador to the United Nations in the Biden administration.

Education 
Prescott earned a Bachelor of Arts degree from Boston University and a Juris Doctor from Yale Law School.

Career 
After law school, Prescott was a clerk for Judge Walter King Stapleton of the United States Court of Appeals for the Third Circuit. He was also a staff attorney at the Lawyer's Committee for Human Rights. Prescott then relocated to Beijing, where he was a visiting professor at the Peking University School of Transnational Law and became the founding director of the branch office of the China Law Center.

Prescott previously served as an advisor to the United States National Security Council on policy related to Iran, Iraq, Syria, and the Persian Gulf. He was also deputy national security advisor and senior Asia advisor for then Vice President Biden. Since leaving the Obama Administration, Prescott became the executive director of National Security Action and a senior fellow at the Penn Biden Center for Diplomacy and Global Engagement.

Footnotes 

 N.b. the appointed role of Deputy to the Ambassador to the UN is a separate position from the Senate-confirmed role of Deputy Ambassador to the United Nations. The Deputy to the Ambassador assists the U.S. Ambassador to the UN by acting as a liaison in Washington, D.C., managing their Washington office, interacting with Congress and acting as a stand-in for the UN ambassador. The two roles co-exist, as in 2019 when Taryn Frideres was Deputy to the Ambassador at the same time that Jonathan Cohen was Deputy Ambassador to the UN.

References 

Living people
Year of birth missing (living people)
Boston University alumni
Yale Law School alumni
Obama administration personnel
American lawyers
Academic staff of Peking University
Biden administration personnel